Fifty-Five Vault is a Ben Folds compilation album featuring 56 tracks, mostly unreleased live recordings and demos. It was released jointly with The Best Imitation of Myself: A Retrospective as a digital-only album available via Folds' website.

Track listing
All songs performed by Ben Folds, unless otherwise noted.

+ denotes previously unreleased.

External links 
 Official Site

Ben Folds Five albums
2011 compilation albums